The Jowett Jupiter is a British sports car which was produced by Jowett Cars Ltd of Idle, near Bradford.

Following the launch of the all new Jowett Javelin and its successes in competition, Jowett decided to use its power train in a sports car for export in the hope of increasing their inadequate steel allocation.

The chassis only was displayed in October at the London Motor Show which opened 28 September 1949 and the complete car for the first time in New York in April 1950.  Again the chassis only was given its continental launch at the Geneva Motor Show which opened 16 March 1950. Initially the car was known as the Jowett Javelin Jupiter however the Javelin part of the name was dropped in February 1951. It continued in production until 1954.

Design features
Jowett through Lawrence Pomeroy of The Motor joined forces with ERA and they persuaded Eberan von Eberhorst, formerly with Auto Union, to come to England. He joined ERA in Dunstable and, amongst other projected development and chassis work, designed and developed what became the Jupiter's tubular steel chassis. The suspension used soft torsion bars and anti-roll bars front and rear with independent suspension at the front. The engine was mounted very far forward ahead of the front axle line with the radiator low behind it over the gearbox. Adjustment of the anti-roll bars easily influenced oversteer and understeer to provide fine suspension tuning. On this torsionally stiff frame Reg Korner of Jowett put a steel framed aluminium drophead coupé body with a bench seat for three people. Eberan's chassis had been designed for a closed coupé and it proved to require strengthening. The anti-roll bars were abandoned. There was no external access to the boot (trunk) and the bonnet (hood) was rear hinged and opened complete with the wings. These cars were only for export, it was hoped coachbuilders would supply the local market.

An initial 75 chassis were supplied to external coachbuilders such as Stabilimenti Farina, Ghia Suisse, Abbott of Farnham and others in Britain. The high cost of these, mostly handsome, bodies for what was only a 1500 c.c. car obliged Jowett to build their own complete cars. The Jowett factory made 731 Mk1 and 94 Mk1a cars. The Mk 1a came out in late 1952 with a little more power (63 bhp) and an opening lid to a boot of larger capacity.

Powertrain

Two Zenith carburettors were fitted. A four speed gearbox with column change was used.

Motor sport success
The Jupiter achieved competition success with a record-breaking class win at the 1950 Le Mans 24 Hour race, a class one-two in the 1951 Monte Carlo International Rally, an outright win in the 1951 Lisbon International Rally, and a class one-two in a gruelling four-hour sports car race on the public road at Dundrod Circuit in Northern Ireland in September 1951. This was a resurrection of the famous Ulster Tourist Trophy races of 1928-1936 previously run on the  Ards circuit. Le Mans was again class-won in 1951 and 1952, and lesser events were taken in 1952 but by 1953 newer faster cars were proving a match for the Jupiter which was after all a well-appointed touring car first and foremost.

Performance and contemporary driving impressions
The test car cost £1086 including taxes. At this time a Jaguar XK120 cost £1263 including taxes when tested by the same magazine.

The final drive ratio on the first publicly presented prototype of 4.1 to 1 was reduced to 4.56 to 1 and it is possible that the final drive on the tested cars was not the same. The Autocar testers were enthused by the car's performance, especially in view of the "well-known ... verve of the Javelin engine" and its "susceptiblity to power output increase". The Jupiter's compression ratio of 8:1 was nevertheless higher than on most UK market cars in 1950, and some mild "pinging" was recorded using 72 octane fuel, which was the highest grade normally available in Britain at the time. Other features drawing particular praise included quick, light though highly geared steering and gear change linkage which was "unusually positive for a steering column layout".

Jupiter R1
A racing derivative of the Jupiter, the R1, was entered in the 1951 1500 cc sports car race at Watkins Glen, driven to first place by George Weaver. In the 1952 24 Hours of Le Mans another example won its class at 13th overall, driven by Marcel Becquart and Gordon Wilkins. Three examples of the R1 were made - one survives.

Jupiter R4
The original Jupiter was a somewhat heavy car and this handicapped its performance.  An intended successor, the R4, was made with fibreglass body and a new lighter chassis and showed the potential of being a genuine  car but Jowett closed before the car could reach production. Three prototypes were made of which two survive.

Popular Culture 

 In Raymond Chandler's The Long Goodbye, Terry Lennox drives a Jowett Jupiter (described as "a rust-colored Jupiter-Jowett with a flimsy canvas rain top under which there was only just room for the two of us").

Note

References

Books

External links

Jowett Car Club Limited site
Jowett Jupiter site
Jowett North West Section
North American Jowett Register
Special Jupiters
Jupiter by Stabilimenti Farina
Jupiter Farina other side
Jupiter R1
Jupiter R4

Jupiter
Cars powered by boxer engines
Cars introduced in 1950
Convertibles
Sports cars